Euphorbia eriantha is a species of spurge known by the common name beetle spurge. It is native to the deserts of northern Mexico and the southwestern United States from California to Texas. This is an annual herb reaching anywhere from 15 to 50 centimeters in height. The leaves are long, narrow, and pointed, sometimes with sparse hairs, and 2 to 7 centimeters long. The foliage may be dark in color, from greenish to purplish or reddish. The inflorescence appears at the tip of the branch and contains staminate or pistillate flowers which are just a few millimeters wide. The fruit is an oblong, hairy capsule half a centimeter long, with gray and black mottling. It contains bumpy white or gray seeds.

References

External links
Jepson Manual Treatment of Euphorbia eriantha
USDA Plants Profile for Euphorbia eriantha
Euphorbia eriantha — UC Photos gallery

eriantha
North American desert flora
Flora of Northeastern Mexico
Flora of Northwestern Mexico
Flora of Arizona
Flora of California
Flora of New Mexico
Flora of Texas
Flora of the Chihuahuan Desert
Flora of the Sonoran Deserts
Flora of the California desert regions
Natural history of the Colorado Desert
Plants described in 1844
Flora without expected TNC conservation status